Knyaginino is a rural locality (a village) in Novoselskoye Rural Settlement, Kovrovsky District, Vladimir Oblast, Russia. The population was 13 as of 2010.

Geography 
Knyaginino is located 24 km south of Kovrov (the district's administrative centre) by road. Maryino is the nearest rural locality.

References 

Rural localities in Kovrovsky District